Quanshui may refer to the following locations in China:

 Quanshui Station, on Line 3 of the Dalian Metro
 Quanshui Subdistrict, Ganjingzi District, Dalian
 Quanshui, Guangxi, town in Pubei County
 Quanshui, Hunan, town in Rucheng County
 Quanshui, Sichuan, town in Qianwei County
 Quanshui Township in Gansu